Arne Michael "Tellus" Thelvén (born January 7, 1961) is a Swedish former professional ice hockey defenceman who played 207 games in the National Hockey League for the Boston Bruins.

Career statistics

Regular season and playoffs

International

External links

Michael Thelvén Biography and Statistics - Olympics at Sports-Reference.com

1961 births
Boston Bruins draft picks
Boston Bruins players
Djurgårdens IF Hockey players
Living people
Ice hockey people from Stockholm
Swedish ice hockey defencemen
Ice hockey players at the 1984 Winter Olympics
Medalists at the 1984 Winter Olympics
Olympic bronze medalists for Sweden
Olympic ice hockey players of Sweden
Olympic medalists in ice hockey